Dmitriy Kim (born 7 October 1989 in Tashkent) is a Uzbekistani taekwondo practitioner. At the 2008 Summer Olympics, he received a walkover against Ezedin Tlish, before losing in the second round to Sung Yu-Chi.  At the 2012 Summer Olympics, he competed in the Men's 68 kg competition, but was defeated in the first round.

References

External links
 

Uzbekistani male taekwondo practitioners
Uzbekistani people of Korean descent
1989 births
Living people
Olympic taekwondo practitioners of Uzbekistan
Taekwondo practitioners at the 2008 Summer Olympics
Taekwondo practitioners at the 2012 Summer Olympics
Asian Games medalists in taekwondo
Taekwondo practitioners at the 2010 Asian Games
Asian Games silver medalists for Uzbekistan
Medalists at the 2010 Asian Games
21st-century Uzbekistani people